This Week in NASCAR (formerly  Inside Nextel Cup) was a 60-minute program that aired Monday nights on the Speed Channel. It was hosted by veteran NASCAR personality Steve Byrnes with panel members Michael Waltrip and Greg Biffle. Other panelists such as Chad Knaus, Bootie Barker, and Dave Blaney made regular appearances. The panel reviewed the past weekend's races and get geared up for the NASCAR racing week ahead with informative and historical videos. Each episode told the stories of the track, region, drivers and offered team perspectives as well as memorable historical races from the track with present and past drivers on hand. Their cameras capture the "behind the scenes" and "show me what I don't already know!" moments, that tell critical, colorful and entertaining race stories.

History
This Week in NASCAR replaced Inside NEXTEL Cup in 2008, with NASCAR personality Steve Byrnes as host from February 18. This Week in NASCAR also replaced the NASCAR Sprint Cup race re-cap and analysis show. It moved into a "handoff" position between events, reviewing topical items from previous races in all three NASCAR national touring series, while also looking forward to upcoming events. Familiar faces also joining the show, including Michael Waltrip and Greg Biffle, who remained a regular Monday night panelist, with NASCAR crew chiefs including four-time champ, Chad Knaus.

The show was pulled at the end of 2009, citing that the show did not "connect with the fans". This decision was met with outrage from many NASCAR fans, with anger especially directed towards the shows replacing its slot.

In 2010, Showtime started a show called Inside NASCAR. It is very similar to This Week In NASCAR, but it runs with Showtimes other programs like Inside the NFL.

Preemptions
This Week in NASCAR did not air on the following Mondays, due to the race being delayed by rain: August 20, 2007; May 25, June 29 and August 3 in 2009.

See also 
NASCAR Inside Nextel Cup

External links 
This Week in Nascar

2008 American television series debuts
2009 American television series endings
NASCAR on television
Speed (TV network) original programming